The Pagan God is a 1919 American silent drama film directed by Park Frame and starring H.B. Warner, Carmen Phillips and Edward Peil Sr.

Cast
 H.B. Warner as Bruce Winthrop
 Carmen Phillips as Tai Chen
 Edward Peil Sr. as Wah Kung
 Yutaka Abe as Wong 
 Carl Stockdale as Henry Addison
 Marguerite De La Motte as Beryl Addison
 Walter Perry as American Minister

References

Bibliography
 Robert B. Connelly. The Silents: Silent Feature Films, 1910-36, Volume 40, Issue 2. December Press, 1998.

External links
 

1919 films
1919 drama films
1910s English-language films
American silent feature films
Silent American drama films
American black-and-white films
Films directed by Park Frame
Film Booking Offices of America films
1910s American films